This page provides supplementary chemical data on diphenylamine.

Physical data
Appearance: white to yellow crystals or powder 
Melting point: 52 - 54 °C 
Boiling point: 302 °C 
Vapour density: 5.82 (air = 1) 
Vapour pressure: 1 mm Hg at 108 °C 
Flash point: 152 °C (closed cup) 
Explosion limits: 634 °C
Autoignition temperature: 635 °C 
Water solubility: Slightly
Specific gravity:  1.16
Flash point: 152
Stability: Stable under ordinary conditions, may discolour on exposure to light. Incompatible with strong acids, strong oxidizing agents.

Toxicology
Toxic. Possible mutagen. Possible teratogen. Harmful in contact with skin, and if swallowed or inhaled. Irritant. 
Toxicity data 
ORL-RAT LD50 2000 mg kg-1 
ORL-MUS LD50 1750 mg kg-1 
ORL-GPG LD50 300 mg kg-1 
ORL-MAM LD50 3200 mg kg-1

Chemical data pages
Chemical data pages cleanup